I Dream of Jeannie... Fifteen Years Later (also titled as I Dream of Jeannie: 15 Years Later) is a 1985 American made-for-television fantasy-comedy film produced by Columbia Pictures Television which premiered on NBC on October 20, 1985. It is the first of two reunion films based on the 1965–1970 sitcom I Dream of Jeannie.

Barbara Eden reprises her role as the magical Jeannie; also reprising their roles from the original series were Bill Daily as Tony's fellow astronaut and best friend Roger Healy, and Hayden Rorke (in his final film role) as NASA psychiatrist Dr. Alfred Bellows. The role of Tony Nelson was played by Wayne Rogers, best known for his role as Trapper John McIntyre on the 1970s series M*A*S*H. Larry Hagman was unavailable to reprise his role as Tony Nelson reportedly because he was too busy filming his CBS series Dallas at the time.

The film was directed by William Asher (who was also the main director of the 1960s show Bewitched) and the teleplay was written by Irma Kalish.

Plot
Jeannie has been a happily married housewife for 15 years to her astronaut husband Tony Nelson and has a teenage son, T.J. When Tony is promoted to Colonel and is about to retire from the NASA space program, Jeannie decides to give him a celebration party in their backyard. However, egged on by his colleagues to retire with a dramatic flair, Tony breaks his promise to Jeannie for one more space flight (aboard the Space Shuttle), this time with a female astronaut, Captain Nelly Hunt.

Jeannie is furious, so she decides to separate from her husband temporarily to be a more independent modern woman. In the meantime, Jeannie's always-scheming evil sister, Jeannie II is determined to have Tony for herself and she teams up with Haji, the chief genie (operating a fitness gym in the United States), to break up her sister's marriage. Jeannie II traps her sister in a bottle with a special stopper, that nobody but another genie could open.

Meanwhile, Tony's space flight is in trouble; the engines won't fire and the shuttle is on a collision course with a meteoroid.

When T.J. comes home and hears his mother trapped in the bottle, he attempts to open the bottle. At first, the stopper would not move, but his mother encouraged him to blink, like she does to invoke her powers. Jeannie encourages her son to concentrate and to blink again, this time the stopper moves. T.J. discovers that he had inherited his mother's powers and is a genie, himself. (Earlier on, T.J. sees his mother using her powers and she explains to him about his heritage, and revealing that she is a genie, and how she became a genie. She also blinked T.J. with her back to the day when she first met Tony.) After blinking, and releasing his mother from her prison, Jeannie and T.J. go to Haji, explaining the trick. Rules must have changed since 1970, because Jeannie now needs special dispensation from the chief of genies in order to do something major, like saving a human life.

Haji gives Jeannie a magic amulet and tells her to blink three times during the full moon while holding it. If she does this, Tony and the shuttle crew will be saved. But the magic comes at a terrible price—every mortal that has ever known Jeannie and T.J., including Tony, will forget that they even exist. T.J. tells his mother that they will lose dad either way, so they might as well do it so Tony lives. Jeannie invokes her magic, saving the shuttle from certain doom, and it is able to return to the ground. However, Jeannie got Haji to agree to one final night together for her and Tony, allowing Jeannie to say farewell to Tony in her heart. The next morning, while Tony is asleep, Jeannie alters the bedroom and then the house to what it might look like if Tony was a bachelor.

With T.J., Jeannie moves on with her life. The final scene shows Jeannie and Tony passing each other on the street, and Jeannie magically gets Tony's attention, indicating that they will in fact find each other again. Before the film ends, Jeannie breaks the fourth wall and says to the viewers, "Haji made me agree to an ending. He never said there couldn't be a new beginning." The film ends with Tony following Jeannie down the street.

Cast
 Barbara Eden – Jeannie/Jeannie II
 Wayne Rogers – Colonel Anthony "Tony" Nelson
 Bill Daily – Colonel Roger Healy
 Hayden Rorke – Dr. Alfred Bellows
 Mackenzie Astin – T.J. Nelson
 Dody Goodman – Scheherazade
 André De Shields – Haji
 John Bennett Perry – Wes Morrison
 Dori Brenner – Dori Green
 Nicole Eggert – Melissa
 Michael Fairman - Gen. Hatten
 Lee Taylor-Allan - Nelly Hunt

Ratings
Prime time Nielsen ratings for I Dream of Jeannie... Fifteen Years Later were high. High ratings by The National Broadcasting Company (NBC) allowed for this reunion episode to be rebroadcast March 30, 1986, Easter Sunday, also in prime time.

Production
I Dream of Jeannie... Fifteen Years Later was filmed at The Burbank Studios in Burbank, California from April 24, 1985 to May 1985. Barbara Eden and Wayne Rogers filmed the beach rescue scene on location at Zuma Beach in Malibu, California, using the same location the original pilot episode was shot in 1964.

Home media
I Dream of Jeannie... Fifteen Years Later was released on Region 1 DVD on January 1, 2013, as part of Sony Pictures Choice Collection online program.

References

External links
 
 
 

1985 films
1985 television films
1980s fantasy comedy films
American fantasy comedy films
Films based on television series
Television films based on television series
Films directed by William Asher
Films scored by Mark Snow
Films shot in California
Genies in film
I Dream of Jeannie
NBC network original films
Television series reunion films
Columbia Pictures films
1985 comedy films
1980s American films